Alain Rousset (born 16 February 1951) is the Socialist president of the Nouvelle-Aquitaine region of France, and a Deputy in the National Assembly of France, representing the 7th constituency of the Gironde.

He was elected to the Regional Council of Aquitaine in 1998 and then reelected in 2004, and he entered the National Assembly in 2007.

He proposed a "Plan for Digital Aquitaine".

References

Sources
Rousset's website
Rousset's dailymotion
"Alain Rousset", Le Monde

1951 births
Living people
Presidents of the Regional Council of Nouvelle-Aquitaine
Members of the Regional Council of Nouvelle-Aquitaine
Sciences Po alumni
Deputies of the 13th National Assembly of the French Fifth Republic
Deputies of the 14th National Assembly of the French Fifth Republic
People from Loire (department)
Socialist Party (France) politicians